Wigfield is a surname, locational for someone from Wigfield. Notable people with the surname include:

Rebecca Wigfield, British bowls player
Tracey Wigfield (born 1983), American comedy writer

See also
Wigfall

References

English toponymic surnames